Malcolm Lang may refer to:

Malcolm Lang (footballer) (born 1941), English footballer
Malcolm Lang (politician) (1875–1941), Canadian politician